"Let's Start All Over Again" is a 1966 pop single recorded by singer Ronnie Dove for the Diamond Records label.

Background
The song was Dove's ninth hit single for the Diamond label.  It made the Billboard Top 20 pop singles chart, and peaked at number 34 on the Easy Listening chart in 1966.

It is not to be confused with a different song of the same name, recorded by The Paragons and The Jesters.

Chart performance

References

1966 singles
Ronnie Dove songs